Thomas R. Carskadon House also known as the Carskadon Mansion and "Radical Hill," is a historic home located on Radical Hill overlooking Mineral Street (US 220), in Keyser, Mineral County, West Virginia.  It is the former residence of Thomas R. Carskadon, an influential Mineral County farmer and political leader.  It was built about 1886, and has two sections: a -story rectangular, brick main block and a two-story rear ell. It features a hip-on-mansard roof and two one-story, brick polygonal bays. It combines features of the Italianate and French Second Empire styles.  Also on the property are the ruins of a brick dairy, the cement foundations of a silo, and the stone foundations of another outbuilding.

It was listed on the National Register of Historic Places in 2002.

See also
Sonnencroft
High Gate

References

External links
Biography of Thomas R. Carskadon

Houses on the National Register of Historic Places in West Virginia
Houses completed in 1886
Italianate architecture in West Virginia
Second Empire architecture in West Virginia
Houses in Mineral County, West Virginia
National Register of Historic Places in Mineral County, West Virginia
Landmarks in West Virginia